Cue sports techniques (usually more specific, e.g., billiards techniques, snooker techniques) are a vital important aspect of game play in the various cue sports such as carom billiards, pool, snooker and other games.

In carom games, an advanced player's aim on most shots is to leave the cue ball and the object balls in position so that the next shot is of a less difficult variety to make the requisite , and so that the next shot is in position to be manipulated in turn for yet another shot; ad infinitum.

Similarly, in many pocket billiards games, an advanced player's aim is to manipulate the cue ball so that it is in position to  a chosen next object ball, and so that the next shot can also be manipulated for the next shot, and so on.  Whereas in the carom games, manipulation of the object ball's position is crucial as well on every shot, in some pool games this is not as large a factor because on a successful shot the object ball is pocketed. However, many shots in one-pocket, for example, have this same added object ball control factor for most shots.

In order to control the cue ball on a shot, a player must master a wide variety of techniques, and have a well-founded conceptual grasp of the mechanics involved. As stated by George Fels, "pool's poet laureate":

Stance

There is no single universally accepted stance, with a wide variation between players who compete at professional cuesports. However, there are a number of common characteristics: generally the back leg is braced while the front leg is slightly bent with the player leaning into the shot; the player's weight is evenly distributed, and the body remains still for the duration of the shot. Many of the modern players face the line of the shot, while a more traditional stance would see the player twist their body so their back foot is at a right-angle to the shot.

Sidespin
The term  (usually not capitalized in this context, and often called "side" in the UK, and sometimes simply called "left" or "right") normally refers to sidespin put on a cue ball by hitting it to the left or right of center. More specific terms are sometimes employed, including "reverse english" for side that closes the cue ball's angle after contacting a cushion, and "natural english" or "running english" for side that widens that angle. Both left and right  change the direction an object ball takes upon impact with the cue ball (the "" effect). For advanced players it is important to understand how the use of  can cause the cue ball to veer off its aiming line (an effect called deflection or "squirt").

An above-center hit on the cue ball is more precisely referred to as "" ("top" in the UK), while a below-center hit is  "draw", "bottom", or "back-spin".  Any time the cue ball is not struck directly in the center of the vertical axis, some sidespin will be imparted either left or right on the cue ball. This unintentional sidespin is a common source of missed shots. Cue-ball spin is not always the shooter's doing; some spin is naturally imparted to the cue ball from contact with the cloth surface on the bed of the table, and by the table's cushions.

Follow
Follow, sometimes called top spin or simply "top," is spin in the direction of travel of the cue ball, so that it is spinning faster than it would from its natural roll. If the cue ball has top spin on it, it will resume rolling forward after making contact dead-on with the object ball and "follow" the object ball rather than stopping abruptly.

Top spin is imparted to a ball by hitting it above the midpoint of its vertical plane as it faces the shooter. Top spin is spin in the direction a ball naturally "wants" to take in reaction to friction from contact with the pool cloth. Because of this, a ball sliding on the cloth will rapidly pick up follow. Likewise, a ball struck so that it is spinning backwards (with draw — see below) immediately starts losing that spin, and if it travels far enough, will reach a sliding point (no spin), soon graduating to natural follow.

Follow applied to a non-dead-on shot will cause the angle of departure of the cue ball from the object ball to widen shortly after impact; the thicker the hit on the object ball, the more this effect will be noticeable (on very thin cut shots it practically does not exist).  Similarly, top spin will cause a widening of the cue ball's rebound angle after impact with a rail cushion.

Follow also increases the rate of cue ball travel, both before and after object-ball impact, and actually imparts a small amount of draw to the object ball.

Force-follow
Force-follow is an extreme variation of follow, produced by an imparting as much top-spin as possible, in a forceful shot that employs a long follow-through, as used on a draw shot but above rather than below centre.  A straight-on force-follow shot causes the cue ball to hesitate for a split second (rebounding from impact), then charge forward again, due to the forward spin it still retains.  It may also refuse a normal rebound from the rail by striking the same rail a second time, due to the forward spin's friction overcoming the rebound.  This shot is useful both in trick shots and in positional play.

Draw
Draw, sometimes called back-spin or "bottom" in the U.K., is backward spin applied to the cue ball by hitting it below the midpoint of its vertical plane as it faces the shooter. If the cue ball is hit with draw, and if that spin remains on the cue ball at the moment of impact with an object ball, the cue ball will reverse direction on a dead-on or center-to-center hit, and "draw" backwards. 

Draw applied to a non-dead-on shot will cause the angle of departure of the cue ball from the object ball to narrow shortly after impact. Similarly, it will cause a narrowing of the cue ball's rebound angle after impact with a rail cushion.

Draw can also be used to slow the rate of cue ball travel as a result of increased friction between the cloth and the cue ball, and reduce the risk of having the cueball roll off line if the table is not level.  This is often called "drag shot" or "drag draw".

A cue ball with back spin can impart a small amount of follow to the object ball.  This is often useful in close combination shots to make the first ball struck follow instead of stun after second ball contact.

Slide
"" refers to a cue ball that is sliding across the cloth with no follow or draw spin. To illustrate this principle, if a ball was marked with a single red dot on it which faced the ceiling at the time the cue ball was struck, an observer would see the cue ball traveling with that red dot remaining fixed at the top of the ball, because the bottom of the ball is sliding over the cloth.

In order to initially achieve a sliding cue ball, a middle-ball hit is employed. The more speed with which the cue ball is hit in this manner, the longer the cue ball will slide before picking up natural forward roll from cloth friction. However, because of this tendency of the cue ball to acquire follow from friction, in order to deliver a sliding cue ball to an object ball at a distance, the cue ball must be precisely hit with the necessary degree of draw so that by the time it reaches the object ball, the draw has dissipated and the cue ball is sliding at the moment of impact.

Stop and stun shots

If the sliding cue ball in the preceding scenario has sidespin on it when it contacts an object ball dead on, it will come to a complete stop but spin in place at that position until the sidespin dissipates. The stun effect can often be enhanced with a minimal amount of draw, to reduce cue ball speed before impact with the object ball.

Because billiard balls are somewhat elastic, the resulting tangent line is slightly less than 90 degrees from perpendicular to a line formed by the contact point between the balls.

If the cue ball hits an object ball at an angle and has follow on it (is spinning forward), the cue ball will first travel on the tangent line and then parabolically arc forward from the tangent line in the direction of cue ball travel. By the same token, when such impact is made and the cue ball has draw (back-spin) on it, the cue ball will first travel on the tangent line and then parabolically arc backward from the tangent line in the opposite direction of cue ball travel. Whether follow or draw is on the cue ball, the faster the cue ball is traveling at the moment of impact, the farther it will travel on the tangent line before arcing forward or backward.

Throw
"" refers to an object ball's motion away from the impact line due to relative sideways sliding motion between the cue ball and object ball caused by sidespin or a cut angle.

Thus, a cue ball with left hand  on it will "throw" a hit object ball to the right. 

This effect is sometimes overarchingly referred to as the "gear system", so-called because of the interaction of the cogwork gears of a each circular gear is interlocked with an abutting circular gear and each spins in the opposite direction of its neighbor in a series.  on the cue ball can cause a very similar effect. If the cue ball with left hand  in the preceding scenario contacts an object ball relatively full and that object ball is frozen to another, the first object ball is thrown to the right and the second to the left, exactly as the name implies.

Throw is also imparted to a ball by collision from a cue ball with no  on it through friction. This is sometimes called "". The direction of the object ball's throw  depends  on  the cue ball's path immediately before impact.  Collision-induced throw "pushes" the object ball in the same direction as the cue ball was traveling before impact. Thus, a cue ball traveling from the left will cause an impacted object ball to be thrown slightly to the left of the OB's natural impact line.

Both varieties of throw are highly influenced by speed. Generally, the less momentum the cue ball possesses at the time of impact, the more that throw will affect the object ball's resultant path of travel.

Semi- ("curve" or "swerve") shot
A cue ball can be made to curve in its path of travel with a  shot. This is usually employed for the purpose of avoiding an interfering ball or balls.

A curve to the left is accomplished by hitting the cue ball with left-hand , and vice versa for a rightward curve. The higher the elevation of the cue, the more severe the degree of curve. The greater force with which a cue ball is hit the farther it will travel in the direction it was hit before beginning to curve.

Such shots are typically referred to as "curve shots" by North Americans and "swerve shots" by the British (not be confused with the swerve effect, below).

shot

"" refers to imparting a high degree of spin along the vertical axis and often on the horizontal axis as well, so that the cue ball reverses direction, sharply curves, or both a few moments after being struck without the necessity of ever contacting another ball or rail.

A  is performed by hitting the cue ball with the butt of the cue stick elevated; usually by 60 degrees or more. While controlling the aim, speed and curve of the cue ball takes a great deal of practice to master, there is a science to it.  After the initial contact, the cue ball will travel straight along the path defined by the horizontal alignment of the cue until the cue ball slows enough for the imparted vertical spin to take over.  The cue ball will then curve onto a line defined by an angle described by the cue ball's initial resting point on the table and point on the table where the cue tip was aimed.  The time before vertical spin overcomes horizontal movement is determined by the force with which the cue ball is struck.   are quite difficult for non-experts, and are not allowed in some venues, as the table's  can be easily damaged by unskilled players.

A massé shot is an equivalent to the hook technique in ten-pin bowling, used to impart spin on the ball and produce a curving pattern.

Swerve effect 
In the two immediately preceding sections, intentional curves of lesser and greater degrees were described. However, because in most billiards shots, the cue is slightly elevated, if  is employed, an unintentional (and often imperceptible to the naked eye) curve results. This is known as "" or "the swerve effect". The farther away an intended target is from the cue ball's original shooting position, the more swerve of the cue ball will affect where the cue ball arrives. The swerve effect should not be confused with a "swerve shot", previously defined as Commonwealth terminology for a curve shot.

Deflection (squirt)
Like the swerve effect, deflection is an unwanted complicating factor, present whenever  is employed.

The physics of deflection has been studied extensively. Basically, when  is used, the cue ball will always begin its travel in a direction not exactly as aimed; it will "squirt" off of the line parallel with the cue's direction. Deflection increases the faster the cue stick is traveling at impact and the more  has been applied.

In more detail, deflection occurs when the cue tip strikes the cue ball right or left of the vertical axis.  When the cue tip strikes the cue ball off the vertical axis, the cue ball will deviate from what would seem to be the obvious path once the cue tip strikes the cue ball.  The reason this occurs and how much the ball deviates from what seems like the obvious path is dependent on many factors that the player must be aware of to properly adjust the line of aim while using side-spin. The most impactful of factors is the front-end weight of the cue stick.  What is actually causing the squirt to occur is the off-center hit on a spherical object from a linear source of energy.  As the energy of the cue stick is imparted to the cue ball from the tip of the cue stick, it is actually making contact with an angled surface when the cue ball is struck off-center.  The more off-center the hit, the more angle the cue tip encounters.  As a result, when the tip strikes the cue ball, it imparts forward energy and a degree of energy directed left or right. – a nudging-to-the-side effect.  The left or right energy serves to push the cueball off the line just a little bit while most of the energy is distributed forward.  A cue stick with less front end mass will naturally serve to minimize the left or right energy imparted on the cue ball thus reducing the amount of squirt realized on the shot.  To really dig into the physics behind why squirt takes place, students from the University of Colorado's physics department wrote a detailed paper explaining the math behind what is taking place (Physics Behind Squirt).

Deflection can be decreased by the type of cue used, and at high levels, players will often select a personal playing cue (or a primary shooting shaft for one) based on the amount of squirt it imparts (the less the better).  Various manufacturers since the late 1990s have developed low-deflection shafts which flex slightly upon impact, to absorb some of this sideways momentum and prevent imparting it to the cue ball. These are essentially opposite the rigid shafts designed for breaking and for jump shots, which are intended to impart all available force into the cue ball.

Because swerve and deflection (for separate reasons) each cause the cue ball to take a different path than aimed, but each does so in the opposite direction of the other, under the right conditions swerve and deflection can cancel each other out.

Jump shot
A "" describes any shot where the cue ball is intentionally driven into the air in a legal manner. It is not permissible in some games (e.g. snooker, blackball, and Russian pyramid) and may be frowned upon or even forbidden in some venues as attempts at it by unskilled players may cause damage to a table's cloth. A legal jump shot requires that the cue ball be struck above center, driving it down into the table, so that the slightly elastic ball will leave the table surface on a rebound. All authoritative rule sources deem it illegal to "scoop" under the cue ball with the tip of the cue to fling it into the air (technically because it is illegal to contact the cue ball with the ferrule of the cue, and because the cue ball is struck twice in rapid succession on such a move, both of which are classic fouls).

Unintentional small jumps are ubiquitous to billiards. In most billiards shots, a player's cue is slightly elevated. Whenever a ball is struck with an elevated cue with much force, a jump, no matter how slight, occurs. An oft-used way to illustrate this principle is to lay a coin on the table approximately an inch in front of the cue ball. When shot very softly, the player will audibly hear the coin being struck and see the cue ball's reaction to that collision. When the same shot is performed with any degree of speed no sound or collision is evident, and it is clear that the coin is being jumped.

Drag
The drag shot is a finesse stroke (usually over a long distance, often the full length of the table) where just enough backspin is applied to the cueball so that it will expire moments before contact with the object ball and finally roll with neither backspin or topspin at a slow pace. The cueball skims over the surface thus negating any nap or deformation (pilling) of the cloth and keeps a straight trajectory, up until the point where the spin wears off and the cueball rolls naturally. The great advantage of the finessed drag shot is that it allows great control of aim on less than perfect surfaces and delivers contact on the originally intended trajectory. Willie Smith was a master of the drag shot.

References

Techniques
Sports techniques
Snooker